Dritëro Agolli (13 October 1931 – 3 February 2017) was an Albanian poet, writer and politician. He studied in Leningrad in the Soviet Union, and wrote primarily poetry, but also short stories, essays, plays, and novels. He was head of the League of Writers and Artists of Albania from 1973 until 1992. He was a leading figure in the Albanian Communist nomenklatura.

Biography
Agolli was born to a Bektashi peasant family in Menkulas in the Devoll District near PMS and finished high school in Gjirokastër in 1952. He later studied at the Faculty of Arts of the University of Leningrad and took up journalism upon his return to Albania, working for the daily newspaper Zëri i Popullit for 15 years. Agolli was also a deputy in the Albanian Parliament.

Beginnings as a poet
Agolli first was a poet. His early verse collections were I went out on the street (Tirana 1958), My steps on the pavement (Tirana 1961), and Mountain paths and sidewalks (Tirana 1965).

Prose attempts
As a prose writer, Agolli first wrote the novel Commissar Memo (Tirana 1970), translated in English as The bronze bust, Tirana 1975. Agolli's second novel, The man with the cannon (Tirana 1975) translated into English in 1983, takes up the partisan theme from a different angle.

After these two novels of partisan heroism, Agolli produced his satirical Splendour and fall of comrade Zylo (Tirana 1973). Comrade Zylo is a well-meaning but incompetent apparatchik, a director of an obscure government cultural affairs department. His pathetic vanity, his quixotic fervour, his grotesque public behaviour, his splendour and fall, are all recorded in ironic detail by his hard-working and more astute subordinate and friend Demkë who serves as a neutral observer. Comrade Zylo is a universal figure, to be found in any society or age, and critics have been quick to draw parallels ranging from Daniel Defoe and Nikolay Gogol’s Revizor to Franz Kafka and Milan Kundera's Zert. Splendour and fall of comrade Zylo first appeared in 1972 in the Tirana satirical journal Hosteni and was published the following year in monograph form.

Albanian League of Writers and Artists

Agolli was head of the Albanian League of Writers and Artists from 1973 until 1992. He was a leading figure in the Albanian Communist nomenklatura.  

From the 1960s until the Communist regime collapsed in the early 1990s, the League accused Albanian writers it deemed guilty of neglecting their responsibility as Communists to reflect the literary style of Socialist Realism in their writings and thereby advance the goals of the Communist Party; some writers were arrested, and either imprisoned for many years or shot, and others were hounded by the state secret police and suffered attacks. Kasem Trebeshina was imprisoned, Pjetër Arbnori (also called Albanian Mandela) was re-convicted in prison for his literary anti-communist work and imprisoned from ages 26 to 54, Bilal Xhaferri was expelled, exiled in communist gulags, and forced to flee to the U.S., Vilson Blloshmi was shot, and many others who were persecuted in many ways. Some survived, such as the poet Xhevahir Spahiu and the writer Ismail Kadare, who ultimately defected to France to escape the regime and its Sigurimi secret police, and thereafter won the Prix mondial Cino Del Duca, the Herder Prize, the Man Booker International Prize, the Prince of Asturias Award, the Jerusalem Prize, the Park Kyong-ni Prize, and the Neustadt International Prize for Literature.

The 1990s

In the early 1990s, he was a member of Parliament for the Socialist Party of Albania. He also founded the Dritëro Publishing Company and published new prose and poetry.

Agolli wrote throughout the 1990s. He has verse collections: The time beggar (Tirana 1995), The spirit of our forefathers (Tirana 1996), The strange man approaches (Tirana 1996), Ballad for my father and myself (Tirana 1997), Midnight notebook (Tirana 1998), and The distant bell (Tirana 1998). Among volumes of prose are: the short story collection Insane people (Tirana 1995); The naked horseman (Tirana 1996), and The devil's box (Tirana 1997).

Agolli, who was a heavy smoker all his adult life, died from pulmonary disease on 3 February 2017 in Tirana at the age of 85.

Legacy 
Though Agolli was a leading figure in the Albanian Communist nomenklatura, he is still widely read in Albania.

Bibliography 

 Akademia e Shkencave e Shqipërisë (2008) (in Albanian), Fjalor Enciklopedik Shqiptar (Albanian encyclopedia), Tirana, 
 Robert Elsie, Historical Dictionary of Albania, New Edition, 2004, 
 Shefki Hysa, "The Diplomacy of self-denial" (Diplomacia e vetëmohimit), publicistic, Tirana, 2008, 
 Namik Selmani, "Salute from Chameria"  publicistic, (2009), Tirana,

References

External links

 Poetry by Dritëro Agolli

1931 births
2017 deaths
Albanian novelists
People from Devoll (municipality)
20th-century Albanian poets
21st-century Albanian poets
Bektashi Order
20th-century Albanian politicians
21st-century Albanian politicians
Respiratory disease deaths in Albania